An early termination fee is a charge levied when a party wants to break the term of an agreement or long-term contract. They are stipulated in the contract or agreement itself, and provide an incentive for the party subject to them to abide by the agreement.

Early Termination Fee – The total fee that will be charged for early termination of a contract or agreement.  If the contract has a declining rate “Early Termination Fee” refers to the initial or starting amount.

Early Termination Fee Amount – The fee that would be assessed at a point in time.  If the contract has a flat fee, the fee remains constant for the period described in the contract.  If the contract has a declining fee the fee decreases at a rate described in the contract as a period elapses.

Early Termination Fee Rate – The Rate at which an Early Termination Fee declines.

Service industries

Termination fees are common to service industries such as cellular telephone service, subscription television, and so on, where they are often known as early termination fees (ETFs). For instance, a customer who purchases cellular phone service might sign a two-year contract, which might stipulate a $350 fee if the customer breaks the contract. Consumer interest groups have criticized such fees as being anti-competitive because they prevent users from migrating to superior services .

In the suburban Atlanta county of Gwinnett, customers were hit with termination fees of over $23 when the county commission chose not to renew the contracts of the county trash collectors in November 2008. The two companies charged this both in violation of county law and in breach of contract.

Mergers and acquisitions

In mergers and acquisitions termination fees are often levied in the event that one party fails to consummate a merger—for instance, because it was unsuccessful in getting shareholder approval or because it agreed to a competing offer. For instance, in 2005 Johnson & Johnson agreed to acquire Guidant, but Guidant later accepted a competing offer and was subject to a termination fee of $705 million.

These termination fees have been criticized as well. Shareholders in companies being purchased sometimes believe that termination fees are too high, and instead of representing the costs that the purchasing party would suffer should the deal fall through, instead act as a way of forcing shareholders and directors to accede to the deal.

See also
Retained interest

External links
Early Termination Fees Calculator
Mergers and acquisitions
Mobile telecommunication services